The County of Vaduz was a historic state of the Holy Roman Empire, now located in the Principality of Liechtenstein. Its capital was the town of Vaduz.

Geography
Located south of the Lordship of Schellenberg, its area corresponds to the current electoral district of Oberland. The territory included the current municipalities of Balzers, Planken, Schaan, Triesen, Triesenberg and Vaduz.

History
The county was created in 1342, after the subdivision of the County of Werdenberg. In 1396 it was granted the imperial immediacy . After the line of succession of the Counts of Vaduz expired in 1416, the territory was bought in a feud from the Barons of Brandis, which maintained their sovereignty until 1507, when the county passed to the Counts of Sulz, who acquired the northern and bordering Lordship of Schellenberg.

In 1613 both territories, while remaining distinct, were sold to the counts of Hohenems.  Ferdinand Karl von Hohenems (1650–1686), for undue appropriation and excessive witch-hunt, was deprived of his dominions in 1684, who returned to the Holy Roman Empire who reassigned them to his brother, the Count Jakob Hannibal (1653–1730). To pay cousin's debts, Hannibal was forced to sell the Lordship (in 1699), and the County (in 1712), to Hans-Adam I, Prince of Liechtenstein. With these territories, in 1719 the prince gained from the Holy Roman Emperor Charles VI the right to found a single state, the present Principality of Liechtenstein.

See also
History of Liechtenstein

References

External links
County of Vaduz (states-world.com)

1719 disestablishments in Europe
States and territories disestablished in 1719
Vaduz, County of
Geography of Vaduz
History of Liechtenstein